Catherine Latimer OC (born in Ottawa) is a Canadian lawyer, criminologist and expert witness. She has served as the executive director of the John Howard Society of Canada since 2011. She earned a BA at the University of Waterloo in 1975, a Masters in Criminology from Cambridge University and a Juris Doctor from Queen's University at Kingston in 1978. She was invested with the Order of Canada in 2018.

References 

Living people
Canadian lawyers
Canadian criminologists
Year of birth missing (living people)